Amphimallon javeti is a species of beetle in the Melolonthinae subfamily that is endemic to Sicily.

References

Beetles described in 1931
javeti
Beetles of Europe
Endemic fauna of Sicily